See Mercedes-Benz SL-Class for a complete overview of all SL-Class models.

The Mercedes-Benz 190 SL (W121) is a two-door luxury roadster produced by Mercedes-Benz between May 1955 and February 1963. Internally referred to as W121 (BII or B2), it was first shown in prototype at the 1954 New York Auto Show, and was available with an optional removable hardtop.

The 190 SL presented an attractive, more affordable alternative to the exclusive Mercedes-Benz 300 SL, sharing its basic styling, engineering, detailing, and fully independent suspension. Both cars had double wishbones in front and swing axles at the rear.  Instead of the 300 SL's expensive purpose-built W198 tubular spaceframe, the 190 SL's R121 structure used a shortened unitary floorpan modified from the W121 base saloon.

The 190 SL was powered by a new, slightly oversquare  Type M121 BII 1.9 L straight-four SOHC engine. Based on the 300 SL's straight six, it had an unchanged 85 mm bore and 4.3 mm reduced 83.6 mm stroke, was fitted with twin-choke dual Solex carburetors, and produced gross . In detuned form, it was later used in the W120 180 and W121 190 models.

The car was available either as a soft-top convertible (initially priced at DM 16,500/US$3,998) or with removable hardtop (DM 17,650/$4,295). A small third-passenger transverse seat was optional. During its first years the 190 SL was available as a sports-racing model with small perspex windscreen and spartan one-piece leather covered bucket seats and aluminium doors. In 1959, the hardtop's rear window was enlarged.

In 1956, a few six-cylinder prototypes were built for testing. A 190SL with a unique engine, using the 300SL block, squeezed into the engine bay with a one-off mix of Benz-bin parts was entered in the 1956 Alpine Rally, but the costs of production would be prohibitive. Two other prototypes, fitted with fuel injected M180 220SE engines were baptised the W127 / 220SL. In June 1956, Rudi Uhlenhaut and Karl Kling lapped the Nürburgring Nordschleife circuit in the two W127s 25 seconds faster than a regular 190SL. On 12 April 1957, MB's board decided to build the W127, six-cylinder 220SL alongside the 190SL, but production challenges postponed manufacturing until it was overtaken by the Mercedes-Benz 230SL 'Pagoda'.

Both the 190 SL and the 300 SL were replaced by the 230SL in 1963.

Super-Leicht or Sport-Leicht

Mercedes-Benz did not announce what the abbreviation "SL" meant when the car was introduced.

Leicht means either "easy" as an adverb or "light" as an adjective in German. Defining a car it has to mean "Light".

It is often assumed that the letters stand for Sport Leicht. One car magazine in 2012 declared that the abbreviation "SL" - "securitized and personally signed by Rudolf Uhlenhaut" meant Super Leicht. This contradicts "Mercedes-Benz 300 SL" of Engelen / Riedner / Seufert, which was produced in close cooperation with Rudolf Uhlenhaut showing that the abbreviation meant Sport Leicht.

Mercedes-Benz used both forms until 2017. It was even called Super Super. On the company website it was called Sport Leicht until 2017 and then changed to Super Leicht.

For a long time it was unclear what intention the company had at the time when assigning the letter combination. It was not until the beginning of 2017 that a chance finding in the corporate archive, from the early part of 1952, clarified that at least in the case of the 300 SL the abbreviation SL stood for Super-Leicht.

Technical data

See also

 Mercedes-Benz SL-Class
 Mercedes-Benz Classic Center

References

190SL
Rear-wheel-drive vehicles
Roadsters
1960s cars
Cars introduced in 1955